Angelyne (born Ronia Tamar Goldberg, September 12, 1950) is an American singer, actress, media personality, and model who came to prominence in 1984 after the appearance of a series of iconic billboards in and around Los Angeles, California, with only one word, "Angelyne", picturing her posing suggestively. These caught the attention of local media outlets, and soon she received several offers for film roles, magazine interviews, and television show appearances. The main trademark of her celebrity persona is a pink Corvette. Her billboards have been featured in a number of movies and television series, including the opening credits of Moonlighting, and spoofed in shows such as The Simpsons, Futurama, and BoJack Horseman. Angelyne was noted for concealing her real name, age, and identity, which did not become public knowledge until 2017.

In 1978, she joined her then-boyfriend's punk rock band Baby Blue, which performed in clubs around Los Angeles, but never became financially successful. In 1982, she released her self-titled debut album and her first posters began appearing as a part of the album's promotion. After the launch of a massive billboard campaign in February 1984, she began working on her second album. Driven to Fantasy was released in 1986. Angelyne then appeared in small parts in films such as Earth Girls Are Easy (1988), Dangerous Love (1988), and Homer and Eddie (1989).

Angelyne is also an artist; she began painting in 1998 and has had several art shows in Los Angeles. She has run for Governor of California twice, during the recall elections of Gray Davis in 2003 and Gavin Newsom in 2021.

Early life
Angelyne's previous names and origins became publicly known in a 2017 article by Gary Baum for The Hollywood Reporter. The article cited public records revealing that Angelyne was born in Poland as Ronia Tamar Goldberg to Holocaust survivors who were Polish Jewish. After being liberated from German Nazi concentration camps, including  Skarżysko-Kamienna, Bergen-Belsen, and Buchenwald, her parents were married in the Föhrenwald DP camp, and then returned to post-war Poland. The family later settled in Bnei Brak, Israel, before immigrating to the United States in 1959. They moved to the Fairfax District of Los Angeles where she went by the name Renee Tami Goldberg. Goldberg attended James Monroe High School and was married briefly.

Career 
In 1978, Angelyne joined her then-boyfriend's band Baby Blue. They performed in local clubs in L.A. and once opened along with Rubber City Rebels for the Screamers' show at the Whisky a Go Go. The punk rock club The Masque served as a rehearsal place for the band. They released a single "Rock n' Roll Rebel" with a B-side, "Fantasy Man". Only 1,000 copies of the record were made and distributed in England.

The band wasn't getting much attention, so they decided to promote it by posting her picture around town. In 1979, the single "Too Much to Touch" was released under the name Angelyne, also promoted by posters and flyers.

In 1982, she released a self-titled debut album on an independent label Erika Records. The 12" picture disc contained 11 songs, including two versions of "Sexy Stranger", a cover of Elvis Presley's hit "Teddy Bear," and the main single "Kiss Me L.A.". Another series of bus-shelter posters promoted the album. In July 1983, Erika Records released another Angelyne single, "My List", accompanied by a music video.

According to Angelyne, she met wealthy adhesive-free-tape entrepreneur Hugo Maisnik (inventor of Hugo's Amazing Tape) in 1982. Maisnik had a display-printing business in Los Angeles. Described as "very eccentric" and a "bored prankster", Maisnik reportedly saw potential in using Angelyne's image and understood the "intricacies of the outdoor-advertising game". In February 1984, Angelyne's first billboard proclaiming "Angelyne Rocks" went up on Sunset Boulevard.

In 1986, she released her second album, Driven to Fantasy, on her label, Pink Kitten. An enhanced pink vinyl re-issue of the album was later released in Italy. In June 1987, an 85 feet high mural depicting Angelyne was painted on the side of a building on Hollywood and Vine. Her manager allegedly financed the $22,000 painting. The same year, her friend Nina Hagen got her recording with Michael "Doc" Dosco, who had previously worked with Hagen on her album Nina Hagen in Ekstasy. He wrote and produced several songs for Angelyne, including "Animal Attraction," which was later featured in Julien Temple's movie Earth Girls Are Easy, where Angelyne had a cameo. The single was released in 1988 with remixes by Italian producer Pino Toma. Hagen mentioned Angelyne in her song "Super Freak Family," and her voice can be heard in "Pillow Talk".

By 1995, she had over 200 billboards up all over Los Angeles.

In 1997, Angelyne launched her website where she offered tours around Sunset Boulevard and Hollywood. In 1998, Angelyne pursued another artistic venture and began painting self-portraits. Since then she has had several successful art exhibitions.

In July 2013, Angelyne signed a contract with designer Michael Kuluva to be a face of a limited edition T-shirt for his clothing line Tumbler and Tipsy.

Political career
She was a candidate for Hollywood city council in 2002, if it were to secede from Los Angeles. She ran for office again in 2003, this time for governor of California. Her slogan during the campaign was "We've had Gray, we've had Brown, now it's time for some blond and pink." Her mascot was a pink Maltese named Budda. She finished 29th in a field of 135 candidates, garnering 2,536 votes.

In April 2021, Angelyne announced plans to run in the 2021 California gubernatorial recall election of Gavin Newsom. She ran without a party preference. The 50% threshold to recall the incumbent governor was not reached. She received 0.05% of the vote and finished 18th out of 46, the highest candidate without a party preference.

Portrayals in popular culture
In 1995, a black-and-white short documentary by Robinson Devor, Angelyne, was released.

The Angelyne Dream Experience, an experimental film by Dan Kapelovitz, who also worked on her EP Beauty & the Pink, was released in 1998. The short film with elements of psychedelia features Angelyne driving in the streets of Los Angeles, greeting her fans and talking about out-of-body experience.

Hugo Maisnik's daughter, Katherine Saltzberg, wrote and performed in the 2009 one-woman play Los Angelyne about her experience growing up in the shadow of the Angelyne billboards.

A limited series based on the life of Angelyne, Angelyne, starring Emmy Rossum and created by Nancy Oliver, was ordered by Peacock in 2020. The series was executive produced by Sam Esmail and Angelyne. Production of the series was delayed due to the COVID-19 pandemic. The first trailer was released in April 2020. The series premiered on Peacock in May 2022.

Discography

Albums 
 Angelyne (1982)
 Driven to Fantasy (1986)
 Beware My Bad Boyfriend (Unreleased)
 Beauty & the Pink (2000)

Compilations 
 Eargasmmm (2019)

Singles

Filmography

Films 

 Phantom of the Paradise (1974)
 The Wild Party (1975)
 Can I Do It... 'Til I Need Glasses? (1977)
 The Frisco Kid (1979)
 Earth Girls Are Easy (1988)
Dangerous Love (1988)
 Hardcase and Fist (1989)
 Homer and Eddie (1989)
 The Malibu Beach Vampires (1991)
 Get Shorty (1995)
 The Angelyne Dream Experience (1998)
 Wild Horses (1998)
 The Underground Comedy Movie (1999)
 Flies on Cupid (2000)
 King of Hollywood (2008)
 Place Like Home (2012)
 Running Wild (2013)
 The Disaster Artist (2017)

Television and documentaries 

 Thicke of the Night (1983)
 The Tube (1985)
 Truth or Consequences (1987)
 Tommy's Hollywood Report (1987)
 Hot Seat (October 10, 1987)
 The Evening Magazine (July 1988)
 Up All Night (1991)
 Hollywood Women (1994)
 Angelyne (1995)
 Boulevard of Dreams (1996)
 Nina Hagen = Punk + Glory (1999)
 The Roseanne Show (March 22, 2000)
 Cleavage (2002)
 Alaska y Mario (2012)

Music videos 

 "My List" - Angelyne – Steve Lomas Productions (c1982)
 "Jimmy Mack" – Sheena Easton (1985)
 "Right on Track" – Breakfast Club (1987)
 "I Can Take Care of Myself" - Billy Vera (1987)
 "City Life" - Tonio K (1988)
 "This Note's for You" – Neil Young (1989)
 "The I.N.C. Ride" – Masta Ace Incorporated (1995)
 "We Are All Made of Stars" – Moby (2002)
 "Pink Christmas" – Slink (2014)
 "Dionysus" – Mikhail Tank (featuring Angelyne as Aphrodite, the Goddess of Love) (2015)
 "Sunshine Sunshine Santa Claus" – Nikki & Candy (2015)
 "Mirror Mountain" – Mini Mansions (2015)
 "Give Up The Wheel" – Stray Echo (2017)
 "Cell" – Fukushima Daisies (2019)
 "Running Red Lights" – The Avalanches (2020)
 “Walk of Fame” - VR Sex (2022)

Billboard appearances 

 Moonlighting (1986)
 Games of Survival (1989)
 The Jigsaw Murders (1989)
 Tax Season (1989)
 Another You (1991)
 Where the Day Takes You (1992)
 Jimmy Hollywood (1994)
 Get Shorty (1995)
 The Fan (1996)
 Volcano (1997)
 Rush Hour (1998)
 8mm (1999)
 The Day After Tomorrow (2004)
 Notorious (2009)
 Rock of Ages (2012)
 Behind the Candelabra (2013)
 Terminator Genisys (2015)

References

External links 
 
 

1950 births
20th-century American actresses
20th-century American singers
20th-century American women singers
21st-century American actresses
21st-century American women singers
21st-century American singers
Actresses from Los Angeles
American women rock singers
American film actresses
American people of Polish-Jewish descent
American punk rock singers
Candidates in the 2021 United States elections
Women new wave singers
Women punk rock singers
Jewish American actresses
Living people
Polish emigrants to the United States
Polish emigrants to Israel
21st-century American Jews